Lovie Lee (March 17, 1909 – May 23, 1997) was an American electric blues pianist and singer. He is best known for his work accompanying Muddy Waters. He also recorded a solo album, in 1992. He was the "adoptive stepfather" of the bluesman Carey Bell and thus the "grandfather" of Lurrie Bell.

Biography
He was born Edward Lee Watson in Chattanooga, Tennessee, and grew up in Meridian, Mississippi. He taught himself to play the piano and began performing in various churches and at rodeos and vaudeville shows. He had already acquired the nickname Lovie from a doting aunt. He found part-time employment playing with the Swinging Cats in the early 1950s. The group included Carey Bell, who Lee took under his "fatherly" protection, and together they moved to Chicago, in September 1956. Lee worked during the day in a woodworking factory, and for many years played in the evening in numerous Chicago blues nightclubs, including Porter's Lounge. He was well known around Chicago for his blues piano playing. He later worked as an upholsterer, but he kept together his backing band, the Sensationals.

After he retired from full-time day work, Lee joined Muddy Waters's band in 1979, replacing Pinetop Perkins on the piano. He was recommended to Muddy Waters by George "Mojo" Buford, who had worked with Lee in North Dakota. Lee stayed with the band until Muddy Waters's death, in 1983, and then returned to playing in Chicago clubs.

Lee made some private recordings in 1984 and 1989, and this work plus later contemporary tracks were released as the album Good Candy (1992). His backing musicians for the album included Eddie Taylor, Odie Payne, Carey Bell and Lurrie Bell.

Lee died in Chicago in May 1997.

Discography
Living Chicago Blues Vol. 3 (1980), Alligator
Good Candy (1992), Earwig Music Company

See also
List of electric blues musicians

References

1909 births
1997 deaths
African-American pianists
American blues pianists
American male pianists
American blues singers
Singers from Tennessee
People from Chattanooga, Tennessee
Songwriters from Tennessee
Chicago blues musicians
Electric blues musicians
Songwriters from Illinois
20th-century American pianists
Earwig Music artists
Alligator Records artists
African-American male songwriters
20th-century African-American male singers